Porečje may refer to:
 , a region in Serbia
 Poreče, a region in North Macedonia